The 1968 NBA World Championship Series pitted the Boston Celtics from the East, against the Los Angeles Lakers from the West, for the sixth time in ten years. The Celtics won their tenth NBA Championship in twelve seasons, by defeating the Lakers in six games.  Significantly, Game 6 marked the first time that any NBA competition had taken place during the month of May. This was the last NBA Finals without a Finals MVP named as the NBA Finals Most Valuable Player Award was introduced the following year.

Series summary

Celtics win series 4–2

Team rosters

Boston Celtics

Los Angeles Lakers

See also
 1968 NBA Playoffs
 1967–68 NBA season

External links
 Sports Illustrated (April 29, 1968) Celtics LA Showdown | Elgin Baylor and Jerry West
 Sports Illustrated (May 13, 1968) This Was One Worth Shouting About
 NBA History

National Basketball Association Finals
Finals
NBA
NBA
Basketball competitions in Boston
Basketball competitions in Inglewood, California
20th century in Los Angeles County, California
1960s in Boston
NBA Finals
NBA Finals
NBA Finals
NBA Finals